4-Chlorobenzoic acid is an organic compound with the molecular formula ClC6H4CO2H.  It is a white solid that is soluble in some organic solvents and in aqueous base. 4-Chlorobenzoic acid is prepared by oxidation of 4-chlorotoluene.

References

Benzoic acids
Chlorobenzenes
Human drug metabolites